McQueen McIntosh (1822 – June 18, 1868) was a United States district judge of the United States District Court for the Northern District of Florida.

Education and career

Born in 1822, near Darien, Georgia, McIntosh read law. He was a planter in Florida. He entered private practice in Jacksonville, Florida from 1850 to 1586.

Federal judicial service

McIntosh was nominated by President Franklin Pierce on February 27, 1856, to a seat on the United States District Court for the Northern District of Florida vacated by Judge Isaac H. Bronson. He was confirmed by the United States Senate on March 11, 1856, and received his commission the same day. His service terminated on January 3, 1861, due to his resignation.

Confederate judicial service and death

Following his resignation from the federal bench, McIntosh served as a Judge of the Confederate District Court for the District of Florida starting in 1861. He died on June 18, 1868, in Pensacola, Florida.

References

Sources
 

1868 deaths
Judges of the United States District Court for the Northern District of Florida
United States federal judges appointed by Franklin Pierce
19th-century American judges
1822 births
19th-century American politicians
Judges of the Confederate States of America
United States federal judges admitted to the practice of law by reading law
Date of birth unknown